Marcel Kolaja (born 29 June 1980 in Moravská Třebová) is a Czech software engineer, Internet freedom and digital rights activist and a Czech Pirate Party politician who serves as a Member of the European Parliament (MEP) since the 2019 election and Quaestor of the European Parliament since 2022. He is a member of the Greens–European Free Alliance parliamentary group along with three other European Pirate Party MEPs.

Kolaja has been a member of the Czech Pirate Party since 2010 and the Vice-President of the Czech Pirate Party since 2022. From 2019 to 2022, he served as Vice-President of the European Parliament. He serves as Quaestor of the Parliament since 2022, being responsible for overseeing the administrative and financial matters of the institution. Kolaja graduated from the Faculty of Informatics, Masaryk University in Brno.

In the European Parliament, in addition to being a Bureau member, he engages in the Committee on the Internal Market and Consumer Protection (IMCO), the Committee on Culture and Education (CULT), and the Special Committee of Inquiry to investigate the use of Pegasus (PEGA), as well as in the delegations for relations with the United States (D-US) and with India (D-IN).

Topics related to the functioning of society in the digital age are his main focus. Marcel Kolaja stands for open technologies, freedom on the Internet, independence of media, transparency, and a united Europe.

Activism and Czech Pirate Party beginnings (2003–2018)
Kolaja worked as an activist against the adoption of software patent legislation in the European Union (EU) from 2003 and joined the Czech Pirate Party in 2010. Kolaja acted as a co-chairman of the Pirate Parties International (PPI) from March to November 2011.

Kolaja was the second candidate of the Czech Pirate Party in the 2014 European Parliament election but was not elected. Kolaja has worked as a technical product manager in Red Hat Czech, a research and development arm of Red Hat, Inc., which itself became a subsidiary of IBM on 9 July 2019.

European Parliament (2019–present)

Election
Kolaja was the party's leading candidate for the 2019 European Parliament election in the Czech Republic and was elected MEP along with Markéta Gregorová and Mikuláš Peksa. His political agenda focuses on digital rights and prevention of increasing Internet censorship; environmental protection such as fossil fuel phase-out and minimizing waste pollution; consumer protection, addressing technological competitiveness of the EU on the world market and limiting corporate lobbying in the EU. Among his priorities is also addressing tax avoidance by multinational corporations that offshore profits via tax havens.

Tenure
In June, Kolaja joined the Greens–European Free Alliance political group of the European Parliament along with three other European Pirate Party MEPs. On 3 July, he was elected one of fourteen Vice-Presidents of the European Parliament. His service as a Vise-President ended in 2022 by being elected as a Quaestor of the European Parliament. Kolaja also serves as a vice-chair of the parliamentary Working Group on ICT Innovation Strategy, as a member of the Bureau of the European Parliament and the European Parliament Committee on the Internal Market and Consumer Protection. Among his most noticeable policy work belongs his role as a shadow rapporteur on Digital Markets Act. His aim is to guarantee fair competition in the online economy by preventing Big Tech gatekeepers from abusing their power.

Due to his background in open-source software development, Kolaja is a strong advocate for free and open-source software as a tool for digital advancements. He played a crucial role in iniciating FOSSEPS - Free and Open Source Software Solutions for European Public Services. The Pilote Project was executed by European Commission and it aims to "manage and protect open source and treat it as a collective, shared and valuable European asset as the use of open source across European institutions and European public services increases".

Committee assignments
Kolaja is a member of the following Committees of the European Parliament:
 Bureau of the European Parliament
 European Parliament Committee on the Internal Market and Consumer Protection (IMCO)
 European Parliament Committee on Culture and Education (CULT)
 Committee of Inquiry to investigate the use of Pegasus and equivalent surveillance spyware (PEGA)
 Delegation for relations with the United States

See also

 Czech Pirate Party#European Union and international relations
 Digital Single Market
 Directive on Copyright in the Digital Single Market
 Free software movement

References

External links
 
 Marcel Kolaja on Czech Pirate Party website

1980 births
Czech Pirate Party MEPs
Living people
Masaryk University alumni
MEPs for the Czech Republic 2019–2024
People from Moravská Třebová
Red Hat employees
Czech software engineers